Calasetta (Ligurian: Câdesédda) is a small town (population 2,919) and comune located on the island of Sant'Antioco, off the Southwestern coast of Sardinia, Italy.

History
While the town itself dates to 1770. In the middle of the 16th century a group of Ligurian families - many of them from Pegli near Genoa - moved to a deserted island off the coast of the Tunisian city of Tabarka in order to work the waters as coral fishermen. These families worked under the tutelage of the wealthy Genoese Lomellini family. These enterprising Ligurian families of Tabarka quickly expanded from coral fishing to trade between the African interior and European markets. Soon, they rose to positions of wealth and success and were awarded the titles of Marquis of Tabarka. Originally the Tabarkini (as descendants in Calasetta are sometimes still called) were protected by the Spanish crown, but increasing population strain, incursions by Barbary pirates, and expansionist competition by France began a long period of trials for many Tabarkini.

In 1738 a group of Tabarkini decided to leave the island off the Tunisian coast permanently. They were received by King Charles Emmanuel III of Savoy in the Kingdom of Sardinia, who gave them the Island of San Pietro to settle. When the Bey of Tunis learned that the Lomellini family intended to cede control of the island to his enemies the French, he invaded the island, destroying homes and warehouses and capturing and enslaving much of the population. Part of the liberated Tabarkini settled in Carloforte, in the San Pietro Island, while other received permission to settle the unhinabited Sant'Antioco, then originating the village of Calasetta. In 1773, more colonists from Piedmont asked for permission to settle Calasetta, but illness and unexpected conditions caused them to return almost immediately.

Culture 

The local dialect, called Tabarkino, is still today similar to that spoken in Pegli and Genoa.

Calasetta is the birthplace of criminal Pietro De Negri (known as Il Canaro).

Economy
Today Calasetta is a favored tourist destination with  beaches, a   port, and a fishing industry.

Twin towns
 Pegli, Italy
 Arenzano, Italy

See also

 Genoese-Tabarka diaspora
 Tabarka
 San Pietro Island
 Carloforte
 Tabarca

References 

Cities and towns in Sardinia
1770 establishments in Italy
States and territories established in 1770
Populated places established in 1770